Sahara is a 1992 adventure novel by Clive Cussler. It is the eleventh book in Cussler's Dirk Pitt series. The 2005 film Sahara was based on the novel.

Plot summary
In 1865, a week before the surrender of Confederate forces of Robert E. Lee, the Confederate Navy ship CSS Texas is being loaded at a dock with crates supposedly filled with documents. The ship's captain, Mason Tombs, has been ordered to take the ship past a Union blockade and to any neutral harbor where she should dock until summoned by a courier. At the last minute the secretary of the Confederate navy and an admiral arrive and mention that he will be taking a prisoner on board. Tombs is shocked when the prisoner arrives under heavy guard with Confederate soldiers in Union uniforms - a prisoner who appears to be Abraham Lincoln.

The ship gets under way and is battered by the Union navy while trying to run the blockade, until Tombs brings the prisoner onto the deck, and the Union soldiers stop firing and salute.

In 1931, Kitty Mannock is flying over the Sahara in quest of a new aviation record. A sand storm fouls her carburetors and she is forced to land in the desert. She manages to touch down on level ground, but the plane reaches the edge of a ravine and tips over. A search is launched, but she is never found.

In 1996, a convoy of tourists are crossing the Sahara on a fleet of Land Rovers when they reach a scheduled stop at a village in the country of Mali. They find it is unusually deserted, and as they are refreshing themselves at the village well they are attacked by red-eyed savages who kill and eat them. Only the tour guide escapes with his life.

Meanwhile, working in Egypt on an archaeological mapping of the Nile, Dirk Pitt is able to rescue Dr. Eva Rojas, a scientist working for the World Health Organization, from a mysterious attacker. Shortly thereafter, Eva flies to Mali with an international team of scientists to investigate a mysterious disease that has been reported from various desert villages. At the same time, Pitt and his best friend Al Giordino are hurriedly flown to a research vessel outside the coast of Nigeria. There they are informed by their boss, Admiral James Sandecker, of an algal bloom, in this case a red tide, that is growing unnaturally fast, and threatens to consume the world's oxygen supply and extinguish almost all life. The growth speed is suspected to be fueled by some type of pollutant.

Dirk, Al and Rudi Gunn are ordered to cruise up the Niger River to search for the pollutant, and determine where it enters the river. They do this aboard the Calliope, a high-performance super-yacht, equipped with comprehensive scientific laboratories, several weapon systems, and an array of communication equipment. The cruise is all well until reaching Benin, where they are forced to engage the Benin navy, which is completely destroyed. The continued trip is calm. They identify the pollutant, and at last find the spot where it appears in the river—but there is no chemical facility in the vicinity, and in fact no sign of anything entering the river.

By now, the Malian armed forces are on their way, along with the Malian dictator General Zateb Kazim, who wishes to seize the yacht for his own use. After dropping Gunn off to make a run for the Gao airport, Pitt and Giordino let the yacht self-destruct after jumping overboard and swimming to the houseboat of the ruthless French businessman Yves Massarde. On his yacht, they manage to contact Admiral Sandecker about Gunn's escape before being captured by Massarde. A UN rescue team picks Gunn up at the airport.

After some interrogation at the houseboat, Pitt and Giordino manage to steal Mr. Massarde's helicopter, which they fly north to Bourem, dumping the chopper in the river. Here they find (and steal) General Kazim's ancient car, an Avions Voisin. They drive the Voisin north, into the desert, toward the chemical waste processing facility Fort Foureau, the only facility that could possibly leak the pollutant into the river. En route to the detoxification facility, Pitt and Giordino run into an American nomad who is searching for a supposed sunken Civil War ironclad. They hide the car and sneak into the facility, only to be captured by Mr. Massarde's security guards, but not before they discover that the processing facility is just a disguise for an underground waste dump sitting right above an underground river, which flows under the sand to the Niger.

Massarde decides to send them to Tebezza, a secret gold mine shared with General Kazim, where prisoners dig for gold under appalling conditions. Here they also find the WHO team, which had been coming too close to the truth about the diseases they were investigating, as well as the French engineers that were contracted to build the processing facility. Dirk and Al manage to escape from the mine, driving 300 km to the east, trying to reach the Trans-Sahara Route. When the gas runs out, they have to walk. They find a cave painting of a Civil War-era monitor, which could not have been drawn in such detail without having seen it. They also find a lost 1930s-era airplane, which they rebuild into a sand yacht. They determine that the crashed airplane had been flown by legendary record-breaking Australian pilot Kitty Mannock, whose disappearance was worldwide news at the time, overshadowed only by that of Amelia Earhart. Mannock's body is lying with the plane, along with her diary, which details her attempts at walking out, her discovery of "an odd ship in the sand", her taking shelter inside the ship, and her eventual return to her plane in a vain hope for rescue. Mannock survived for ten days, and from her diary Pitt and Giordino are able to determine how long she walked from the plane, and in which direction, giving them an area to search for the lost ironclad. Using the sand yacht they built from Mannock's plane, they finally reach the Trans-Sahara Route and are picked up by a passing truck on the way to Adrar, Algeria. They quickly reach Algiers, from where they inform Admiral Sandecker about the appalling situation in Tebezza.

The UN team that rescued Rudi Gunn earlier is dispatched to Alger to pick up Pitt and Giordino, and is then flown to Tebezza. They successfully attack Tebezza and close it for good, but not before an alarm is sent to General Kazim. An aircraft from the Malian air force is sent there to investigate, and destroys the UN aircraft just as the team returns from the mine. They are now stranded, and decide to make a run for the real Fort Foureau, a French Foreign Legion fortress that gave the waste processing plant its name, and plan to later hijack a waste train to carry the team and the rescued prisoners to safety in Mauritania.

While at the fortress their presence is discovered and the trains are stopped. Giordino and a commando use a stripped attack buggy to reach a US Delta unit in Mauritania, while the Malian army attacks the fortress with everything they have. After severe losses for both sides, the Delta unit comes to the rescue aboard a train, quickly defeating the Malian army and killing General Kazim.

Now Pitt and Giordino borrow an attack helicopter and go to take over the Fort Foureau facility. They also force Mr. Massarde to lie out in the desert sun naked for three hours, after which he drinks several litres of water which was secretly polluted from the waste dump. They then let him board his chopper and leave, knowing that he will not survive. 

In the end, the waste dump is cleaned up, the water pollutant is removed and the red tide growth rate decreases. The rescued Tebezza prisoners are treated for malnutrition and various injuries. The ironclad, which turns out to be the Texas, is dug up and the lost airplane is restored and placed in a museum. Dirk Pitt also ships general Kazim's Avions Voisin to his own car collection.

It is revealed that the conspiracy theory about Lincoln being on the Texas was true: Lincoln was abducted during a coach ride by Confederates dressed in Union uniforms, led by a Captain Neville Brown (who claimed he'd kidnapped Lincoln on his deathbed in 1908). It turned out Stanton knew of the kidnapping and, fearing public anger, covered it up by hiring John Wilkes Booth to stage the Lincoln Assassination (with another actor as a double for Lincoln). Jefferson Davis planned to use Lincoln to force the Union to negotiate, but Stanton turned him down. Determined not to make a martyr out of Lincoln, Davis put him on board the Texas. After the ship was lost, Davis never told anyone about the kidnapping of Lincoln, fearing Northern anger. The crates of documents carried by the Texas were actually the Confederacy's treasury, which was to be smuggled to another country where a government in exile was to be established and the war continued.

2005 film adaptation
In 2005 Director Breck Eisner filmed an adaptation of the novel, starring Matthew McConaughey as Dirk Pitt, Steve Zahn as Al Giordino, and Penélope Cruz as Eva Rojas. The film had a rather large production budget of $145,000,000 and eventually grossed only $121,671,925, internationally. As such, although Philip Anschutz and Crusader Entertainment originally obtained the rights to adapt a number of Cussler's books, it is doubtful that more will be made.

Additionally, due largely to contract interpretation regarding Cussler's authority over the adapted screenplay, he ultimately sued Crusader Entertainment. Amid litigation, Crusader eventually brought charges back upon Cussler, claiming he personally hindered the film's publicity and performance, as well as provided false information in the original contract.
Cussler lost the decision when the jury found he acted unfairly and in breach of contract. Crusader was awarded $5 million from Cussler who was found to have violated a "covenant of good faith." A California Court of Appeals decision later overturned the $5 million award.

The film had several alterations from the original novel, including but not limited to the removal of the events at Tebezza and the almost complete omission of the "Kitty Mannock" backstory, which did not test well in pre-release screenings.  The stand made at the original Fort Foureau was also omitted. However, in a 2003 ReadersRoom interview, Cussler accepted the fact scenes needed to be removed for the production of a two-hour film.

References

1992 American novels
Dirk Pitt novels
Novels set in Africa
Films set in Africa
American novels adapted into films
Books with cover art by Paul Bacon